The Hero Honda Karizma ZMR is a mid-range sport-tourer motorcycle manufactured in India, first by a partnership of Hero Honda and later years by Hero Motorcorp. The motorcycle was in the market for a long time; beginning with its first launch in 2003 under the Karizma brand, its rebranding in 2007 under the Karizma R brand. Further, the Karizma R brand was a given a cosmetic upgrade in September 2009 resulting in its change in the name to Karizma ZMR. There was minor difference between its engine and that of its predecessor Karizma R. The minor differences lied in the design of fairing, headlights, addition of digital speedometer, rear disc brake and rear swing-arm suspension and the fuel-injection system instead of the carburettor. In 2014, the ZMR was relaunched with EBR inspired design  and the same, but improved engine tuned to deliver more power and torque. In addition, the tail-light design was changed as well as widening of the rear tyre to improve handling following previous critical reviews.

References

Related bikes
Hero Honda Ambition 135 
Hero Honda Karizma R 
Hero Honda Splendor 
Hero Honda Hunk 
Hero Passion 
Hero Pleasure 
Hero Honda Achiever 
Honda Shine 
Honda Unicorn 
Hero Honda CBZ 
Hero Honda Karizma 
Hero Honda Super Splendor
Honda Activa

Karizma ZMR
Motorcycles introduced in 2009